The Roman Catholic Archdiocese of Calabozo is a Roman Catholic archdiocese in Calabozo, Venezuela.  It was a diocese until 1995.

History
The then-Diocese of Calabozo, embracing the section of Guárico and portions of the sections of Apure, Zamora, Portuguesa, Cojedes and Guzman Blanco, was created 7 March 1863 by Pius IX as a suffragan of the Archdiocese of Caracas (Santiago de Venezuela), and its first bishop was consecrated 30 October 1881.  John Paul II elevated the diocese to an archdiocese on 17 June 1995. As a metropolitan archdiocese, it has 2 suffragans:

San Fernando de Apure
Valle de la Pascua

Bishops

Ordinaries
Salustiano Crespo † (4 Aug 1881 – 12 Jul 1888)
Felipe Neri Sendra (Sendrea) † (25 Sep 1891 – 9 May 1921)
Arturo Celestino Álvarez † (9 May 1921 – 8 Jan 1952)
Antonio Ignacio Camargo † (8 Jan 1952 – 2 Sep 1957) Appointed, Bishop of Trujillo
Domingo Roa Pérez † (3 Oct 1957 – 16 Jan 1961) Appointed, Bishop of Maracaibo
Miguel Antonio Salas Salas, C.I.M. † (16 Jan 1961 – 20 Aug 1979) Appointed, Archbishop of Mérida
Helímenas de Jesús Rojo Paredes, C.I.M. (24 Mar 1980 – 27 Dec 2001)
Antonio José López Castillo (27 Dec 2001 – 22 Dec 2007) Appointed, Archbishop of Barquisimeto
Manuel Felipe Díaz Sánchez (10 Dec 2008 – present)

Coadjutor bishops
Arturo Celestino Álvarez † (1919-1921)
Antonio Ignacio Camargo † (1949-1952)

Auxiliary bishops
Antonio Ignacio Camargo † (1947-1949), appointed Coadjutor here
Víctor Manuel Pérez Rojas † (1998-2001), appointed	Bishop of San Fernando de Apure

See also
Roman Catholicism in Venezuela

References

Roman Catholic dioceses in Venezuela
Roman Catholic Ecclesiastical Province of Calabozo
Religious organizations established in 1863
Roman Catholic dioceses and prelatures established in the 19th century
1863 establishments in Venezuela
Calabozo